The Country Music Awards of Australia also known as the Golden Guitar Awards (originally named Australasian Country Music Awards) is an annual awards night held in January during the Tamworth Country Music Festival, in Tamworth, New South Wales, celebrating recording excellence in the Australian country music industry.  The awards are hosted at the Tamworth Regional Entertainment Centre (TRECC) on the final Saturday night of the Tamworth Festival. They have been held annually since 1973. The first award ceremony had just six awards. The awards show is presented in fornt of live audience made up from the media, the music industry and the public.

Awards
The award winners are given a Golden Guitar trophy. These are cast in solid bronze on a base of polished Tasmanian Blackwood. They are 235 mm tall and weigh 1.5 kilos.

Australian Roll of Renown

Since 1976, the Australian Roll of Renown is an award to honour Australian and New Zealander country music artists who have shaped the industry by making a significant and lasting contribution to Country Music.

Major awards
Here is a list of major award winners.

References

Australian music awards
Australian country music
Music festivals in Australia
Tamworth, New South Wales
1973 establishments in Australia
Awards established in 1973
Australia